The Panhard PL 17 is an automobile made by the French manufacturer Panhard from 1959 until 1965.  Presented on 29 June 1959, as successor to the Panhard Dyna Z, the PL 17 was developed from the older car, but with an much more streamlined body than its predecessor. The four-door saloon was joined by the Cabriolet in 1961, and by the Break, a five-door estate version, in April 1963. The Break, developed by Panauto, sat on a longer wheelbase but was of the same overall length. It was built in very small numbers, only about 2,500 being produced overall.

Model name

From the 1964 model year, the letters PL were dropped; this approximately coincided with the takeover the company by Citroën.  Other names were lightly changed as well, with the addition of a "B" (for Berline) and "BT" for the Tigre model. The luxurious Grand Standing version was replaced by the "Relmax". The car also underwent a slight facelift, losing the chrome unibrow at the front.

Technical specifications
Initially, the car continued to use the engines of the Dyna Z, both of 851 cc. The standard one gave  (DIN), the "Tigre" gave  (DIN). The engines are twin-cylinder air-cooled "boxer" types, mounted with the gearbox at the rear and the two exhausts at the front. Beginning in July 1960, the engines decreased in capacity to 848 cc (to suit tax limits at 850 cc in many markets), with power remaining as before.

The front wheels are driven through a four-speed gearbox with column shift, with synchromesh on the upper three gears. Suspension at the front is provided by two transverse leaf springs, and at the back by three torsion bars each side.

This space was available from model year 1964, when the spare wheel was moved from beneath the luggage space to under the bonnet, where it fits around the air filter. This is possible because the wheels have no centre — that is formed by the finned aluminum brake drums.

Sales
The Panhard saloons produced after the Citroën take-over were not priced aggressively. The Panhard was a little longer and a little wider, forcing dealers to explain why an 850 cc Panhard should cost more than a 1300 cc Simca. Panhard connoisseurs, including many taxi owners, appreciated the PL 17's superior road holding and fuel economy, as well as the extra space afforded by the Panhard's greater cabin width. Less pleasing were the awkward gear box, still without synchromesh on the bottom ratio, and the steering which was heavy at low speeds. Performance, especially for the top of the range  "PL 17 Tigre" was helped by the Panhard's lighter body, although the extent of Panhard's weight advantage had been reduced over the previous decade as aluminium had become more expensive and light metal panels had been substituted for some of the steel ones. Pricing issues may explain why PL 17 sales levels were too low to enable the model to reach the volumes of the Aronde.

A sporting two-door coupé with a fibreglass body on PL17 basis was built from 1956 until 1963 by Arista as the Passy and later also Sport, with the Tigre engine. Not much lighter and only marginally faster than a regular PL17, the rather expensive Arista did not find many buyers.

Motor sport
In 1961, a Panhard PL 17 won the Monte Carlo Rally. Evidence that this was no mere fluke came from the PL 17s that took second and third places, showing that a lightweight car with an 850 cc engine could be more than a match for heavier cars with more muscular power units.

Rally Victories

{|class="wikitable" style="font-size: 95%; "
! No.
! Event
! Year
! Driver
! Co-driver
|-
| 1
|  30ème Rallye Automobile de Monte-Carlo
| 1961
|  Maurice Martin
|  Roger Bateau
|-
|}

Demise
In 1955, Citroën had acquired a minority 25% interest in Panhard, and ten years later, in 1965, Panhard's automobile division was finally absorbed by Citroën:  the company ceased production of the PL 17 in the same year. The 24 model carried the manufacturer's name for two years more, and from then only military transport was badged with the Panhard name, the military division being the part of the business still not owned by Citroën.

References

External links

1960s cars
Cars introduced in 1959
Panhard vehicles
Cars powered by boxer engines